Argentina at the 1948 Summer Olympics in London, England was the nation's eighth appearance out of eleven editions of the Summer Olympic Games. Argentina sent to the 1948 Summer Olympics its fifth national team, under the auspices of the Argentine Olympic Committee (Comité Olímpico Argentino) of 199 athletes (188 men and 11 women) who competed in 101 events in 16 sports. It would not be until the 2016 Summer Olympics that the athlete delegation were surpassed. The medals haul of 3 golds, 3 silvers, and a bronze tied the medals haul in 1928. The achievement of 7 medals in an edition of the Olympics has yet to be matched.

Medalists

Athletics

Key
Note–Ranks given for track events are within the athlete's heat only
Q = Qualified for the next round
q = Qualified for the next round as a fastest loser or, in field events, by position without achieving the qualifying target
NR = National record
N/A = Round not applicable for the event
Bye = Athlete not required to compete in round
NP = Not placed

Men
Track & road events

Men
Field Events

Combined events – Decathlon

Women
Track & road events

Women
Field events

Basketball

This was the first time Argentina sent a team to the Olympics, the team consisted of 14 players

Team Roster

Group C

|}

Preliminary Round (Group C)

Classification Matches
 9th/16th place
 
 13th/16th place
 
 15th/16th place: Defeated Hungary (walk-over) → Fifteenth place

Boxing

Cycling

Road races
Individual times added to together for team race, 3 times needed for team event.

Track 
Ranks given are within the heat.

Equestrian

Dressage

Jumping

Eventing

Fencing

19 fencers, 16 men and 3 women, represented Argentina in 1948.
The results are the pool results and placings.

Men

Women

Field hockey

This was the first time Argentina had competed in this event at the Olympic Stage.

Men's tournament

Head coach:

Group A

Gymnastics

Artistic

Modern pentathlon

A point-for-place system was used, with the lowest total score winning.

Rowing

Argentina had 26 male rowers participate in all seven rowing events in 1948.

Ranks given are within the heat.

Sailing

Shooting

Twelve shooters represented Argentina in 1948.

Swimming

This was the 5th time Argentina had sent a team of swimmers to the Olympics, the team of 17 consisted of 11 men and 6 women.

Ranks given are within the heat.

 Men

 Women

Water polo

Men's Team Competition

Head coach:

Round 1

Group F

Round 2

Group J

Weightlifting

Wrestling

Men's Greco-Roman

References

Nations at the 1948 Summer Olympics
1948
1948 in Argentine sport